A monoamine reuptake inhibitor (MRI) is a drug that acts as a reuptake inhibitor of one or more of the three major monoamine neurotransmitters serotonin, norepinephrine, and dopamine by blocking the action of one or more of the respective monoamine transporters (MATs), which include the serotonin transporter (SERT), norepinephrine transporter (NET), and dopamine transporter (DAT). This in turn results in an increase in the synaptic concentrations of one or more of these neurotransmitters and therefore an increase in monoaminergic neurotransmission.

Uses
The majority of currently approved antidepressants act predominantly or exclusively as MRIs, including the selective serotonin reuptake inhibitors (SSRIs), serotonin–norepinephrine reuptake inhibitors (SNRIs), and almost all of the tricyclic antidepressants (TCAs). Additionally, psychostimulants acting as MRIs that affect dopamine such as cocaine and methylphenidate are often abused as recreational drugs. As a result, many of them have become controlled substances, which in turn has resulted in the clandestine synthesis of a vast array of designer drugs for the purpose of bypassing drug laws; a prime example of such is the mixed monoamine reuptake inhibitor and releasing agent mephedrone.

Types of MRIs
There are a variety of different kinds of MRIs, of which include the following:

 Specific for one monoamine transporter
 Serotonin reuptake inhibitor (SRI)
 Selective serotonin reuptake inhibitor (SSRI)
 Norepinephrine reuptake inhibitor (NRI)
 Selective norepinephrine reuptake inhibitor (sNRI)
 Dopamine reuptake inhibitor (DRI)
 Non-specific, binding to two or more monoamine transporters
 Serotonin–norepinephrine reuptake inhibitor (SNRI)
 Serotonin–dopamine reuptake inhibitor (SDRI)
 Norepinephrine–dopamine reuptake inhibitor (NDRI)
 Serotonin–norepinephrine–dopamine reuptake inhibitor (SNDRI)

Binding profiles

See also
 Monoamine releasing agent

References

External links